Vrbičany may refer to places in the Czech Republic:

Vrbičany (Kladno District), a municipality and village in the Central Bohemian Region
Vrbičany (Litoměřice District), a municipality and village in the Ústí nad Labem Region